Bernát Csányi may refer to:

 Bernát Csányi (politician), Hungarian politician and official
 Bernát Csányi (soldier) (1630–1664), Hungarian soldier